Ent-copalyl-diphosphate diphosphate-lyase may refer to:
 Ent-cassa-12,15-diene synthase, an enzyme
 Ent-sandaracopimaradiene synthase, an enzyme
 Ent-pimara-8(14),15-diene synthase, an enzyme
 Ent-pimara-9(11),15-diene synthase, an enzyme
 Ent-isokaurene synthase, an enzyme